Crack dot Com was a computer game development company co-founded by ex-id Software programmer Dave Taylor, and Jonathan Clark.

History 
Crack dot com started from home with a staff of just four people. Their first completed game, which had Internal Revenue Service agents as the enemies, was never released. The company released only one game, Abuse, an MS-DOS scrolling platform shooter which sold over 80,000 copies worldwide. Based on a public source code release, Abuse was ported to a wide variety of platforms including Microsoft Windows, MacOS, AIX, SGI Irix, Amiga/AmigaOS, and Linux.

Prior to the company's closing in October 1998, they were working on Golgotha, a hybrid of first-person shooter and real-time strategy. Citing publisher interference in the creative design of Abuse, Crack dot com opted not to accept any offers from publishers until the game was completed. The game was never finished and Crack dot com made the source and data for Golgotha (as with Abuse) public domain.

The company experienced a setback on January 13, 1997 when their file server was broken into by way of their web server, and the source code to Golgotha and also the Quake engine they had licensed from id was stolen. This did result in a number of unofficial ports for Quake, most notably an SVGAlib version for Linux that was later mainlined by id, as well as unauthorized ports to OS/2, Amiga, Java VMs, and Mac OS. The source code for both Quake and Golgotha were later legally released.

External links
 official webpage (offline, archived)

References 

Defunct video game companies of the United States
Video game development companies
Video game companies disestablished in 1996
Video game companies disestablished in 1998
American companies disestablished in 1996
American companies disestablished in 1998